Khando is a rural locality (a selo) in Chankovsky Selsoviet, Botlikhsky District, Republic of Dagestan, Russia. The population was 33 as of 2010.

Geography 
Khando is located 19 km north of Botlikh (the district's administrative centre) by road, on the Chankovskaya River. Ankho is the nearest rural locality.

References 

Rural localities in Botlikhsky District